"Dead" is a song recorded by American singer Madison Beer, recorded for her debut extended play, As She Pleases (2017). It was released to digital retailers on May 19, 2017, as the lead single from the EP, alongside a lyric video. The song was written by Brittany Amaradio, Madison Love, and Michael Keenan, the latter of whom produced the track. It was promoted by two remixes and an acoustic version of the song.

Composition
Speaking about the song's inspiration, Beer stated "It's about a situation myself and so many others find themselves in when you feel ignored and not loved in a relationship, yet you’re still hearing empty words like 'I can't live without you,' and it tears you up inside so I wanted to make the anthem for staying strong through this moment and not taking any shit!"

"Dead" is an indie pop song with a length of three minutes and fourteen seconds. Musically, it features breathy vocals from Beer over a beat that has been described by one music critic as "danceable". Taylor Weatherby, writing for Billboard, compared the song to the works of Ariana Grande and JoJo. Lyrically, it has been described as a breakup anthem where the singer confronts a lying boyfriend. In the chorus, Beer sings "You say you can't live without me, so why aren't you dead yet?" Some sources suggested that the lyrics were about Beer's breakup with American singer Jack Gilinsky.

Critical reception
Mike Wass, writing for Idolator, called the song a "biting kiss-off" that "repositions her as an alt-pop diva". Mike Nied, also writing for Idolator, wrote the song's chorus "boasted one of the best lyrics of the year". On behalf of Billboard, Taylor Weatherby described the song as "edgy" and wrote that it "is sure to strike a chord with just about anyone who hears it".

Music video
The music video for "Dead" was released on August 3, 2017. It was directed by Darren Craig. The video features the singer singing much of the song in a bathtub, with scenes of Beer and an ex-boyfriend interspersed throughout. Presley Gerber  Mike Wass of Idolator called the video "sexy and emotional".

Track listing
Digital download
"Dead" – 3:14

Cedric Gervais Remix
"Dead" (Cedric Gervais Remix) – 3:19

Acoustic
"Dead" (Acoustic) – 3:44

Laibert Remix
"Dead" (Laibert Remix Radio Edit) – 3:59
"Dead" (Laibert Remix Club Edit) – 4:25

Charts

Certifications

References

2017 singles
Indie pop songs
Songs written by Madison Love
Madison Beer songs